James E. Burke (February 28, 1925 – September 28, 2012) was an American man who was the CEO of Johnson & Johnson from 1976 to 1989, a company for which he worked forty years.  He was the older brother of the television executive Dan Burke.

Early life
Burke was born in Rutland, Vermont. He served as an ensign in the United States Navy during World War II where he commanded a landing craft tank in the Pacific.  After the war, he earned his BA at the College of the Holy Cross in 1947 and his MBA from the Harvard Business School in 1949.

Career
J&J announced that Richard B. Sellars would step down as CEO as of November 1, 1976, and be replaced by Burke. As CEO, Burke is credited for the growth of Johnson & Johnson to its current size and prominence, but he is perhaps best known for his crisis management in 1982, when it was found that Tylenol capsules had been poisoned with cyanide.

In addition to his duties with Johnson & Johnson, Burke served as an outside director for IBM and was instrumental in the ousting of John Akers and bringing in former American Express and RJR Nabisco CEO Louis V. Gerstner Jr. to replace him.

Following his retirement, he was appointed the second chairman of the national nonprofit organization Partnership for a Drug-Free America (PDFA), formed by a consortium of advertising professionals who ran a research-based media campaign to discourage teenage use of illegal drugs such as marijuana. Burke was honored for his public service advertising work by then US president Bill Clinton, who awarded him the Presidential Medal of Freedom, the highest civilian award in the United States. Fortune magazine named him as one of the ten greatest CEOs of all time and he has a membership in the National Business Hall of Fame.

He received the Bower Award for Business Leadership in 1990. He was elected to the American Philosophical Society in 1991 and the American Academy of Arts and Sciences in 1993.

In 1993, Burke received the S. Roger Horchow Award for Greatest Public Service by a Private Citizen, an award given out annually by Jefferson Awards.

He was president of the Business Enterprise Trust that honored acts of courage, integrity and social conscience in business.

References

1925 births
American manufacturing businesspeople
Businesspeople in the pharmaceutical industry
Harvard Business School alumni
College of the Holy Cross alumni
2012 deaths
People from Rutland (city), Vermont
Presidential Medal of Freedom recipients
Members of the American Philosophical Society